Khvajeh District is in Heris County, East Azerbaijan province, Iran. At the 2006 National Census, its population was 30,151 in 7,001 households. The following census in 2011 counted 28,085 people in 7,696 households. At the latest census in 2016, the district had 28,535 inhabitants in 8,530 households.

References 

Heris County

Districts of East Azerbaijan Province

Populated places in East Azerbaijan Province

Populated places in Heris County